The 1953–54 Scottish Division A was won by Celtic, who finished five points ahead of the second placed club Heart of Midlothian. Celtic won their 20th league title with a match still to play, when they defeated Hibernian 3–0 at Easter Road on 17 April 1954. It was the club's first league championship win in 16 years. Airdrieonians and Hamilton Academical finished 15th and 16th respectively and were relegated to the 1954–55 Scottish Division B.

League table

Results

References 

 Statto.com

1953–54 Scottish Football League
Scottish Division One seasons
Scot